Kabbalah: Mythic Judaism is a 1997 role-playing game supplement for Ars Magica published by Atlas Games.

Contents
Kabbalah: Mythic Judaism is a supplement in which the Jewish Quarters of Mythic Europe are detailed.

Reception
Kabbalah: Mythic Judaism was reviewed in the online second version of Pyramid which said "anyone who thought that the Order of Hermes were a strange bunch really needs to look at this, the latest supplement, which deals with some of the Order's most formidable neighbors; the rabbinical Kabbalists of the European Jewish community."

Reviews
Backstab #12

References

Ars Magica supplements
Role-playing game supplements introduced in 1997